HM Advocate v Ross was a 1991 Scots criminal law case decided by the High Court of Justiciary. The defendant had been charged with violently attacking others in a public house, but was allowed to go free on the premise that he was in a state of non-self-induced automatism. Others in the bar had slipped LSD and other drugs into his beer without him knowing, and there was only a small amount of alcohol he had been drinking so he was not responsible for his intoxication which led to the violent actions.

This case set a key precedent in Scots law for automatism, namely that since this case, if someone has been under the effect of drugs that they themselves did not voluntarily know they were taking or were under the influence of and commit a violent act, it may be a defence for them in court if they can prove or give evidence that their intoxication was not self-induced.

Later cases suggested that the Scottish precedent established in Ross would be followed in England as well.

References

External links
Full text of opinion from BAILII

High Court of Justiciary cases
1991 in Scotland
1991 in case law
1991 in British law